Lin Yu-an (born September 22, 1988) is a Taiwanese swimmer, who specialized in individual medley events. Lin qualified for the men's 400 m individual medley at the 2004 Summer Olympics in Athens, by clearing a FINA B-cut of 4:33.10 from the National University Games in Taipei. He participated in the first heat against three other swimmers Saša Imprić of Croatia, Andrew Mackay of the Cayman Islands, and Nikita Polyakov of Uzbekistan. He raced to third place by a 9.74-second margin behind Impric in 4:41.76. Lin failed to advance into the top 8 final, as he placed thirty-fifth overall on the first day of preliminaries.

References

1988 births
Living people
Taiwanese male swimmers
Olympic swimmers of Taiwan
Swimmers at the 2004 Summer Olympics
Swimmers at the 2006 Asian Games
Male medley swimmers
Sportspeople from Taipei
Asian Games competitors for Chinese Taipei
20th-century Taiwanese people
21st-century Taiwanese people